The Northern Ireland (Miscellaneous Provisions) Act 2006 (c 33) is an Act of the Parliament of the United Kingdom.  It set out new provisions in relation to the registration of electors and the conduct of elections in Northern Ireland.  It also restricted political donations, extended the period for arms decommissioning by former paramilitary organisations in Northern Ireland, and made a few other changes in the law relating to Northern Ireland.

Section 31 - Commencement
The following orders were made under this section:
The Northern Ireland (Miscellaneous Provisions) Act 2006 (Commencement No.1) Order 2006 (S.I. 2006/2688 (C.91))
The Northern Ireland (Miscellaneous Provisions) Act 2006 (Commencement No.2) Order 2006 (S.I. 2006/2966 (C.104))
The Northern Ireland (Miscellaneous Provisions) Act 2006 (Commencement No. 3) Order 2006 (S.I. 2006/3263 (C.118))
The Northern Ireland (Miscellaneous Provisions) Act 2006 (Commencement No.4) Order 2008 (S.I. 2008/1318 (C.56))
The Northern Ireland (Miscellaneous Provisions) Act 2006 (Commencement No.5) Order 2009 (S.I. 2009/448 (C.30))

See also
Northern Ireland Act

References
Halsbury's Statutes

External links
The Northern Ireland (Miscellaneous Provisions) Act 2006, as amended from the National Archives.
The Northern Ireland (Miscellaneous Provisions) Act 2006, as originally enacted from the National Archives.
Explanatory notes to the Northern Ireland (Miscellaneous Provisions) Act 2006.

United Kingdom Acts of Parliament 2006
Acts of the Parliament of the United Kingdom concerning Northern Ireland
2006 in Northern Ireland